Hinwil railway station is a railway station in the Swiss canton of Zurich and municipality of Hinwil. The station is situated at the junction of the Effretikon to Hinwil via Wetzikon railway line, which is still in full use, and the Uerikon to Bauma railway (UeBB), which is partly closed and partly used as a heritage railway.

Hinwil station is the terminus of Zurich S-Bahn route S14, which operates from Zurich via Uster and Wetzikon. 

Hinwil station is also the terminus of services of the Dampfbahn-Verein Zürcher Oberland (DVZO), who operate heritage services to Bauma, over the former UeBB, with trains normally hauled by steam locomotives. The UeBB line in the other direction, towards Uerikon, was closed in 1948 and little now remains.

Gallery

References

External links 

 

Hinwil
Hinwil